Perseus (c. 150 BC) was an ancient Greek geometer, who invented the concept of spiric sections, in analogy to the conic sections studied by Apollonius of Perga.

Life
Few details of Perseus' life are known, as he is mentioned only by Proclus and Geminus; none of his own works have survived.

Spiric sections
The spiric sections result from the intersection of a torus with a plane that is parallel to the rotational symmetry axis of the torus.  Consequently, spiric sections are fourth-order (quartic) plane curves, whereas the conic sections are second-order (quadratic) plane curves.  Spiric sections are a special case of a toric section, and were the first toric sections to be described.

Examples
The most famous spiric section is the Cassini oval, which is the locus of points having a constant product of distances to two foci. For comparison, an ellipse has a constant sum of focal distances, a hyperbola has a constant difference of focal distances, and a circle has a constant ratio of focal distances.

References

 Tannery P. (1884) "Pour l'histoire des lignes et de surfaces courbes dans l'antiquité", Bull. des sciences mathématique et astronomique,  8, 19–30.
 Heath TL. (1931) A history of Greek mathematics, vols. I & II, Oxford.
 

Ancient Greek geometers
2nd-century BC Greek people
2nd-century BC mathematicians